Kalamai may refer to:

kalamai (dessert), a coconut pudding from the Mariana islands
an older name for Kalamata, a city in southern Greece
Kalamai (Messenia), a town of ancient Messenia, Greece
Kalamai, Uganda, a village in Teso sub-region, Uganda